D305 is a state road in Gorski Kotar region of Croatia connecting Čabar to D32 state road leading to Delnice, and the A6 motorway Delnice interchange.

The road, as well as all other state roads in Croatia, is managed and maintained by Hrvatske ceste, state owned company.

Road junctions and populated areas

Sources

State roads in Croatia
Transport in Primorje-Gorski Kotar County

hr:Državna cesta D204